Reese Clark  (September 19, 1847 - May 26, 1921) was a California Assemblymen serving the 21st district from 1891 to 1891. He also served as a private (bugler) in Company A, 1st Oregon Cavalry Regiment of the Union Army during the American Civil War from 1860 to 1865.

References

1847 births
1921 deaths
Union Army soldiers
Republican Party members of the California State Assembly